John Anthony "Tony" Smith (born January 1945) is a British manager and music and film producer. He was talent manager for the band Genesis, for the solo careers of Phil Collins, Mike Rutherford and Tony Banks. and co-manager of Pink Floyd along with Paul Loasby.

In 2000, the Music Managers Foundation presented him with the Peter Grant Award.

In his early career he promoted shows, with acts such as The Beatles, The Rolling Stones and the Who. Tony Smith went on to co-found (with Jon Crawley in 1977) the Hit & Run Music Publishing house, located in the United Kingdom. Along with Hilary Shor, he has expanded into film production under the name Hit and Run Productions. As a film producer, he has produced the films Children of Men and Eye of the Beholder.

Smith is a historic car racer and has owned an Aston Martin DB4 GT Zagato Sanction II Coupe, one of only four ever made, which in 2012 was auctioned by Bonhams for a record-breaking £1.2 million with fees.

References

1939 births
Living people
English music managers
Genesis (band)
Place of birth missing (living people)